The Beagle class (officially redesignated as the G class in 1913) was a class of sixteen destroyers of the Royal Navy, all ordered under the 1908-1909 programme and launched in 1909 and 1910. The Beagles served during World War I, particularly during the Dardanelles Campaign of 1915.

Design
For the 1908–1909 shipbuilding programme, the British Admiralty decided to revert to a smaller, more affordable destroyer to follow-on from the large and fast  (required to reach ) and the experimental  . The destroyers needed sufficient range to operate across the North Sea in the event of a confrontation with Germany, which rendered the  coastal destroyers which had been built as a low-cost supplement to the expensive Tribals outdated, requiring larger numbers of a cheaper standard destroyer. While the Tribals were oil fuelled, it was decided to return to the use of coal for the new destroyers, because of concerns over the availability of oil stocks in the event of a war and to reduce costs. They were the last British destroyers to be so fueled.

The Beagles were not built to a standard design, with detailed design being left to the builders of individual ships in accordance with a loose specification. It was expected that the ships would displace  but the builder's designs came out heavier, at about  normal and  full load. Five Yarrow or White-Forster boilers fed direct-drive steam turbines driving three propeller shafts. Three funnels were fitted.
  
The Beagle class was designed to carry a gun armament of five 12-pounder (76 mm) guns, with two mounted side by side on a raised platform on the ship's forecastle, two on the ship's beams, with the port gun mounted ahead of the starboard gun and one aft. While the ships were building, however, it was decided to replace the two forecastle guns by a single  gun, giving a gun armament of one BL 4 inch naval gun Mk VIII and three QF 12-pounder 12 cwt guns) Torpedo armament consisted of two  torpedo tubes, with one between the ship's funnels and the aft gun, and one right aft at the stern of the ship. Two spare torpedoes were carried.

Wartime modifications included replacement of the aft torpedo tube by a 3-pounder (47 mm) anti-aircraft gun in some ships, while depth charges were also fitted.

Service
As the Beagles completed in 1910, they joined the 1st Destroyer Flotilla of the Royal Navy's Home Fleet. but in 1913 they were sent to the Mediterranean, where they formed the 5th Flotilla, remaining there on the outbreak of the First World War. They were officially redesignated the G class in October 1913 as part of a general re-designation of the Royal Navy's destroyers. The Beagle class spent most of the war in the Mediterranean, with several taking part in the Dardanelles Campaign. Late in 1917, the ships of the class were recalled to British waters, where three ships were lost to accidents, two by running aground and one to collision.

Being coal-fired, they were obsolete by the end of the First World War and the surviving ships were all scrapped by the end of 1921.

Ships

Notes

Citations

Bibliography

 

 
Destroyer classes
Ship classes of the Royal Navy